Barbara Giacomuzzi (born September 3, 1974) from Cortina d'Ampezzo is an Italian cross-country skier.

Anti-doping rule violation 
In July 2014, the Italian National Olympic Committee handed her a 3-month ban from sports for an anti-doping rule violation, after she had tested positive for betamethasone.

Cross-country skiing results
All results are sourced from the International Ski Federation (FIS).

World Cup

Season standings

Team podiums

 1 podium

Other results 
 1995:
 1st, Cross-Country Skiing Continental Cup, 10 km classic, in Brusson
 1st, Continental Cup, 5 km classic, in Brusson
 2nd, Continental Cup, 5 km free, in Brusson
 2nd, Continental Cup, 10 km classic, in Seefeld
 3rd, FIS race, 5 km classic, in Kandersteg
 3rd, FIS race, 5 km free, in Rogla
 1996:
 1st, Continental Cup, 10 km classic, in Campra
 1st, Continental Cup, 5 km classic, in Furtwangen
 2nd, Continental Cup, 10 km free, in Campra
 3rd, Italian women's championships of cross-country skiing, 30 km

References

External links
 

1974 births
Living people
Italian sportspeople in doping cases
Doping cases in cross-country skiing
Italian female cross-country skiers